Stéphane Fontaine is a French cinematographer. He graduated from the École nationale supérieure Louis-Lumière in 1985, and began his career as first assistant camera on films directed by Arnaud Desplechin, Jim Jarmusch, Leos Carax and Olivier Assayas, among others. He won the César Award for Best Cinematography in 2006 for The Beat That My Heart Skipped and in 2010 for A Prophet.

Filmography

Decorations 
 Chevalier of the Order of Arts and Letters (2015)

References

External links

Living people
French cinematographers
Date of birth missing (living people)
Place of birth missing (living people)
Chevaliers of the Ordre des Arts et des Lettres
Year of birth missing (living people)